The 2018 Greenwich London Borough Council election took place on 3 May 2018 to elect members of Greenwich London Borough Council in England. This was on the same day as other local elections.

Results summary

|}

Ward results

Abbey Wood

Blackheath Westcombe

Charlton

Coldharbour and New Eltham

Eltham North

Eltham South

Eltham West

Glyndon

 Resigned part way through term due to criminal conviction.

Greenwich West

Kidbrooke with Hornfair

Middle Park and Sutcliffe

Peninsula

Plumstead

Shooters Hill

Thamesmead Moorings

Woolwich Common

Woolwich Riverside

2018-2022 by-elections

References

2018 London Borough council elections
2018